Ouanary Airport  is an airport serving Ouanary, a commune of French Guiana near its eastern border with Brazil.

See also

 List of airports in French Guiana
 Transport in French Guiana

References

External links
OpenStreetMap - Ouanary
OurAirports - Ouanary

Airports in French Guiana